The Ayensuano constituency is in the Eastern region of Ghana.  the member of Parliament for the constituency is Ayeh-Paye Samuel. He was elected  on the ticket of the New Patriotic Party (NPP) and  won a majority of 3,892 votes more than candidate closest in the race, to win the constituency election to become the MP. He succeeded Godfred Kwame Otsere who had represented the constituency in the 4th Republican parliament on the ticket of the New Patriotic Party (NPP). .

See also
List of Ghana Parliament constituencies

References

Parliamentary constituencies in the Eastern Region (Ghana)